Robert Peterson (born 1924 Denver - September 21, 2000 Fairfax, California) was a widely anthologized American poet.

Life
His childhood was spent in San Francisco at the Fielding Hotel, a Union Square hotel owned by his adoptive parents.
He graduated from the University of California at Berkeley. He was an Army combat medic in the 86th Division, during World War II.  He studied at San Francisco State College.

He was writer-in-residence at Reed College, Portland, Oregon from 1969-1971. After leaving Reed College, Peterson lived in Taos, New Mexico. He started his own publishing company, Black Dog Press, in the Bay Area, and created artworks that showed in local galleries. He also served a writer-in-residence at Oregon's Willamette University from 1991-1992.

His papers are held at University of California Santa Cruz.

He died at his home in Fairfax, California.

Awards
 1981 National Poetry Series for Leaving Taos
 1972-1973 Amy Lowell Poetry Travelling Scholarship
 1965 National Endowment for the Arts

Works
``Home for the Night,'' Amber House Press, 1962

Anthologies

References

1924 births
2000 deaths
University of California, Berkeley alumni
San Francisco State University alumni
Willamette University faculty
Reed College faculty
20th-century American poets
People from Fairfax, California
United States Army personnel of World War II